"Chills" is a song recorded by Canadian rap rock group Down with Webster, taken from their second major-label studio album, Party for Your Life (2014). The song was written by the members of Down With Webster and Emerson Brooks along with the song's producers, Matthew Samuels and Zale Epstein and Brett Ryan Krueger, under their production monikers Boi-1da and The Maven Boys, respectively. It was released through the group's own DWW Entertainment on December 17, 2013, as the third single from Party for Your Life. The single went Platinum on July 21, 2014, and has sold 78,000 digital copies.

Music video
The official lyric video for the song premiered on MetroLyrics on December 20, 2013, before being uploaded to VEVO and YouTube on December 23, 2013. In the video, the lyrics of the song are traced in the fogged up windows of a Kia Sorento by an unseen person in the dark of night. Amanda Hutchison of Metro Lyrics praised the video's "unique concept" and how well it fit with the song's lyrics.

On March 7, 2014, the group released the official music video. The video, shot in greyscale, shows each of the group members alone in an empty room with their hands covering their face, and an image of their face projected onto the backs of their hands. MuchMusic blogger Liam Scott described the visual effects in the video as "pretty nifty (if slightly creepy)," which helped deliver the titular chills.

Awards and nominations

Chart performance
"Chills" entered the Billboard Canadian Hot 100 at No. 41 for the week ending January 4, 2014. It peaked at No. 19, which it held for two weeks straight.

Charts

Weekly charts

Year-end charts

Certifications

References

2013 singles
Down with Webster songs
Song recordings produced by Boi-1da
2013 songs
Song recordings produced by the Maven Boys
Songs written by Boi-1da